Temper Temper were an English musical duo active in the early 1990s whose members were songwriter/producer Eric Gooden (of Sweet Mercy) and singer Melanie Williams.

Gooden and Williams were previously known as the duo No Sovereign who released the single "Showdown" in 1987 on Geffen Records.

The duo released their only album, the self-titled Temper Temper in 1991. It contains the single "Talk Much" which briefly registered on the UK Singles Chart.

After Temper Temper
Gooden continued as a producer with his act Sweet Mercy (alongside Eric Powell) and continues to release material to the present day. The duo had two top 10 UK Dance hits in 1996 with "Happy Days" and "Into Your Heart", the latter under the name '6 by Six'.

Williams went solo and featured on dance trio Sub Sub's 1993 UK No. 3 hit "Ain't No Love (Ain't No Use)", then in 1994 released the album Human Cradle (also produced by Gooden) on the Columbia label which spawned four UK chart hits, including the top 30 duet version of "You Are Everything", with Joe Roberts. They both formed the duo Dark Flower in 2001, then changed their name to Bodhi in 2007 and later Butterfly Jam in 2011.

Discography

Albums
Temper Temper (1991), Virgin/10

Singles
"Like We Used To" (1991), 10
"It's All Outta Lovin' You" (1991), 10
"Talk Much" (1991), 10/Virgin - UK No. 94

References

External links

English musical duos
English dance music groups
British soul musical groups
Male–female musical duos
Musical groups established in 1991
Musical groups from Manchester
Virgin Records artists